The wattled brushturkey (Aepypodius arfakianus) is a species of bird in the family Megapodiidae. It is found in New Guinea. Its natural habitats are subtropical or tropical moist lowland forest and subtropical or tropical moist montane forest.

References

Aepypodius
Birds of New Guinea
wattled brushturkey
wattled brushturkey
Taxonomy articles created by Polbot